Chromidotilapia is a genus of cichlid fishes. The genus contains 11 species. Of these, 9 are from Central Africa, one (C. guentheri) is found from Liberia to Cameroon, while the remaining species (C. cavalliensis) is restricted to Côte d'Ivoire.

Species
There are currently 11 recognized species in this genus:
 Chromidotilapia cavalliensis (Thys van den Audenaerde & Loiselle, 1971)
 Chromidotilapia elongata Lamboj, 1999
 Chromidotilapia guntheri (Sauvage, 1882) (Günther's mouthbrooder)
 Chromidotilapia kingsleyae Boulenger, 1898
 Chromidotilapia linkei Staeck, 1980
 Chromidotilapia mamonekenei Lamboj, 1999
 Chromidotilapia melaniae Lamboj, 2003
 Chromidotilapia mrac Lamboj, 2002
 Chromidotilapia nana Lamboj, 2003
 Chromidotilapia regani (Pellegrin, 1906)
 Chromidotilapia schoutedeni (Poll & Thys van den Audenaerde, 1967)

References

Chromidotilapiini
Fish of Africa
Cichlid genera
Taxa named by George Albert Boulenger